Ronneburg is a town in the district of Greiz, in Thuringia, Germany. It is situated 7 km east of Gera.

History
Within the German Empire (1871–1918), Ronneburg was part of the Duchy of Saxe-Altenburg.

References

External links
 District Greiz

Towns in Thuringia
Greiz (district)
Duchy of Saxe-Altenburg